For the 1965 Vuelta a España, the field consisted of 100 riders; 51 finished the race.

By rider

By nationality

References

1965 Vuelta a España
1965